Jorge Aizkorreta Jurado (born 6 February 1974) is a Spanish retired footballer who played as a goalkeeper.

Football career
Born in Barakaldo, Biscay, Aizkorreta arrived at Athletic Bilbao's youth system at the age of 17. After two solid years with the B-team in the second division, he was promoted to backup in the main squad, appearing in eight official games in his only season – all in La Liga, his official debut coming on 3 December 1995 in a 2–1 home win against Real Valladolid – and conceding as many goals.

Subsequently, Aizkorreta signed with CD Logroñés, starting most of the matches in the 1996–97 campaign but suffering relegation from the top level. After two more seasons in division two with the Riojan he continued playing in that category until his retirement in 2007, representing CF Extremadura, Racing de Ferrol and Elche CF (under contract with the Valencian Community side for three years, he only appeared three times in the league for the club in his last two seasons combined).

Aizkorreta was part of the Spanish squad at the 1996 Summer Olympics in Atlanta, being an unused player in an eventual quarter-final exit.

Honours

International
Spain U21
UEFA European Under-21 Championship: Runner-up 1996

References

External links

Racing de Ferrol profile 
Biography at Elche CF 

1974 births
Living people
Spanish footballers
Footballers from Barakaldo
Association football goalkeepers
La Liga players
Segunda División players
Bilbao Athletic footballers
Athletic Bilbao footballers
CD Logroñés footballers
CF Extremadura footballers
Racing de Ferrol footballers
Elche CF players
Spain under-21 international footballers
Olympic footballers of Spain
Footballers at the 1996 Summer Olympics